Jack Tanner may refer to:

 Jack Tanner, a fictional presidential candidate in the mockumentary, Tanner '88
Jack Edward Tanner, United States federal judge
Jack Tanner (trade unionist), British trade union leader and syndicalist activist
 Jack Tanner, a fictional British soldier during World War II, in a book series by James Holland.

See also
John Tanner (disambiguation)